Clarence Oliver Drake (May 28, 1903 – August 19, 1991) was an American film/television director, screenwriter, producer and actor who was most active in the Western genre. Though Drake began his career as an actor, he is best known as a prolific screenwriter and director of low-budget Western films (sometimes referred to as B-Westerns). Drake was most active in the 1930s and 1940s, although he continued writing and directing films until 1974.

His films include Today I Hang (1942).

Selected filmography
 Red Blood and Blue (1925)
 Cyclone of the Range (1927)
 The Cherokee Kid (1927)
The Flying U Ranch  (1927)
 The Boy Rider (1927)
 The Desert Pirate (1927)
 Red Riders of Canada (1928)
 When the Law Rides (1928)
 Phantom of the Range (1928)
 The Little Buckaroo (1928)
 Driftin' Sands (1928)
Orphan of the Sage  (1928)
 The Pinto Kid (1928)
 The Drifter (1929)
 The Vagabond Cub (1929)
 The Cheyenne Cyclone (1931)
 The Law of the Tong (1931)
 The Hurricane Horseman (1931)
 West of Cheyenne (1931)
 Law and Lawless (1932)
 Battling Buckaroo (1932)
 The Reckless Rider (1932)
 The Scarlet Brand (1932)
 The Wyoming Whirlwind (1932)
 Lawless Valley (1932)
 Guns for Hire (1932)
 The Texas Tornado (1932)
 Via Pony Express (1933)
 War of the Range (1933)
 Gun Law (1933)
 Trouble Busters (1933)
 Fighting Through (1934)
 Arizona Bad Man (1935)
Lightning Triggers (1935)
 The Cheyenne Tornado (1935)
West of Texas (1937)
 Nation Aflame (1937)
 Arizona Legion (1939)
 Shut My Big Mouth (1942)
 The Lone Star Trail (1943)
 Riders of the Dawn (1945)
 The Lonesome Trail (1945)
Ginger (1946)
 Moon Over Montana (1946)
 Deadline (1948)
 Across the Rio Grande (1949)
 Trail of the Yukon (1949)
 Battling Marshal (1950)
 Outlaw Treasure (1955)
 The Parson and the Outlaw (1957)

References

External links

Western Film Maker Oliver Drake, South Fork Companion blog

1903 births
1991 deaths
American male screenwriters
American film producers
20th-century American male actors
20th-century American businesspeople
20th-century American male writers
20th-century American screenwriters
Film directors from Idaho
Screenwriters from Idaho
Male actors from Idaho